Events from the year 1952 in Pakistan.

Incumbents

Monarch
 King George VI (consort – Queen Elizabeth) until February 6
 Queen Elizabeth II (consort – Prince Philip) from February 6

Federal government
 Governor-General – Malik Ghulam Muhammad
 Prime Minister – Khawaja Nazimuddin
 Chief Justice: Abdul Rashid

Governors
 Governor of Northwest Frontier: Khwaja Shahabuddin 
 Governor of West Punjab: Abdur Rab Nishtar 
 Governor of Sindh: Mian Aminuddin

Events

January–March
 January 26 – At the Dhaka session of the ruling Muslim League party, prime minister Khawaja Nazimuddin declares Urdu the national language of the state of Pakistan.
 January 30 – The Awami League holds a secret meeting, attended by a number of members from the communist front mobilising full political and student support.
 February 20 – Section 144 of the Code of Criminal Procedure, 1898, prohibiting processions and meetings is promulgated in Dhaka.
 February 21 – The first ethnic riots occur in Dhaka, East Pakistan against attempts to make Urdu the national language and lack of representation for Bengalis in central administration. This marks the start of the political struggle for the Bengali Language Movement.

April–June
 May 15 – Conference is held amongst delegates from India and Pakistan in Karachi to consider implementation of a visa and passport system between the two countries.

July–September
 August 14 – Pakistan celebrates 5 years of independence.

October–December
 November 23 – Basic Principles Committee (BPC) presents the second revised report to the Constituent Assembly. The report called for a parity of representation between East and West Pakistan in parliament elected on the basis of separate balloting for minorities.

Births

January–June
 February 1 – ACM Tanvir Mahmood Ahmed, Pakistan's air chief from 2006 to 2009
 March 4 – Salman Bashir, retired diplomat and former Foreign Secretary
 March 13 – Dr Tahir Amin, political scientist, educator and chairman of National Institute of Pakistan Studies at Quaid-i-Azam University, Islamabad
 March 17 – Abid Ali, television actor

July–December
 July 15 – Raisul Islam Asad, Bangladeshi actor
 September 1 – Lt Gen Masood Aslam, statesman and Pakistan's ambassador to Mexico
 September 9 – Zaka Ashraf, banker and former chairman of the Pakistan Cricket Board
 October 5 – Imran Khan, cricketer and prime minister
 November 11 – Shamim Azad, poet, storyteller and writer
 November 16 – Abid Azad poet, critic and literary editor
 November 25 – Imran Khan, cricketer, politician and leader of Pakistan Tehreek-e-Insaf
 December 9 – Liaqat Baloch, political leader

Full date unknown
 Lt Gen A.T.M. Zahirul Alam, force commander of the United Nations Mission in Liberia

Deaths
 Ahmed Ullah Ajmeri, film director
 January 7 – Ustad Jhande Khan, music composer and director
 April 16 – Arzoo Lucknowi, Urdu poet
 August 1 – Jamshed Nusserwanjee Mehta, first and longest-serving mayor of Karachi (b. 1886)
 October 16 – Ghulam Bhik Nairang, Indian/Pakistani Muslim leader, poet (b. 1876)

See also
 1951 in Pakistan
 Other events of 1952
 1953 in Pakistan
 List of Pakistani films of 1952
 Timeline of Pakistani history

References

 
1952 in Asia